Nikhil Thakur (born 16 March 1993) is a hacker and Internet activist. He is popular for exposing scams in Madhya Pradesh. At the age of 19 he hacked the Madhya Pradesh BSNL website and later on he hacked the India BSNL website. He hacked the Rajiv Gandhi Proudyogiki Vishwavidyalaya website. Later on he started exposing scams. He exposed the scholarship scam of arihant, priyatam, BM, colleges held in Indore and later on he exposed the big pre-medical test scam held in Madhya Pradesh.

References

Further reading
 
 
 

1993 births
Living people
Indian Internet celebrities